Matilde Ponce Copado (1932-2001) was a Cuban modernist architect.

Matilde Ponce Copado was born in Trinidad, Santa Clara Province, Cuba on March 14, 1932. Ponce attended the Instituto de Segunda Enseñanza del Vedado in Vedado. She matriculated at the University of Havana in 1949, graduating from the school in 1955.

Following graduation, Ponce worked at the Municipal Urban Department in Havana where she designed a number of public projects.

Ponce married Antonio Quintana Simonetti, a fellow architect who had taught Ponce at the University of Havana. The couple collaborated on a number of projects.

References 

Cuban women architects
1932 births
2001 deaths
People from Trinidad, Cuba
University of Havana alumni
20th-century architects